Mohd Nazri Abu Hassan is a Malaysian politician. He was elected Perikatan Nasional MP for Merbok in the 2022 general election. He is member of Malaysian United Indigenous Party (BERSATU), a component party of Perikatan Nasional (PN).

Election results

References

See also 
 Members of the Dewan Rakyat, 15th Malaysian Parliament

Living people
Members of the 15th Malaysian Parliament
21st-century Malaysian politicians
Malaysian United Indigenous Party politicians
Year of birth missing (living people)